Sicambre (1948–1975) was a French Thoroughbred racehorse and Champion sire.

Background
Sicambre was bred by Jean Stern at his Haras de Saint Pair du Mont in Le Cadran, Calvados. Stern raced and owned him throughout his life.

Racing career
Trained by Max Bonavent, in the only defeat of his career, Sicambe finished second in the 1950 Prix Morny. He then won the 1950 Grand Criterium, France's most important race for two-year-olds. At age three, Sicambre won three important conditions races plus  two French Classics, the Prix du Jockey Club and Grand Prix de Paris, in the process earning a Timeform rating of 135.

Stud record
Sicambre was retired to stand at stud beginning in 1952 at his owners Haras de Saint Pair du Mont where he died on April 30, 1975. Sicambre represented a strong power and stamina of the 1950s. The leading sire in France in 1966, Sicambre sired: 
 Sicarelle (b. 1953) - won 1956 Epsom Oaks
 Celtic Ash (b. 1957) - won Belmont Stakes, 3rd leg of the U.S. Triple Crown series
 Ambergris (b. 1958) - won Irish Oaks, Champion Irish Three-Year-old Filly
 Hermieres (b. 1958) - 1961 Prix de Diane 
 Belle Sicambre (b. 1961) - Won 1963 Prix Eclipse, 1964 Prix de Diane and Prix Saint-Alary
 Cambremont (b. 1962) - won Poule d'Essai des Poulains
 Diatome (b. 1962) - won 1965 Prix Noailles, Washington, D.C. International Stakes, 1966 Prix Ganay
 Roi Dagobert (dkb/br. 1964) - won 1967 Prix Lupin, Prix Greffulhe, Prix Noailles
 Sacramento Song (b. 1967) - a sire who influenced the breeding history of show jumping horses 

Through his daughter Sicalade, Sicambre was the damsire of Sea Bird who won the 1965 Prix de l'Arc de Triomphe and who earned the highest Timeform rating in history.

See also
List of leading Thoroughbred racehorses

External links
 Sicambre's pedigree and partial racing stats

1948 racehorse births
1975 racehorse deaths
Racehorses bred in Calvados (department)
Racehorses trained in France
French Thoroughbred Classic Race winners
Thoroughbred family 7-e
Chefs-de-Race